Luca Parlato (born 25 June 1991 in Vico Equense) is an Italian rower. He won the gold medal at the 2013 World Championships.

Parlato is an athlete of the Gruppo Sportivo della Marina Militare.

References

External links 

1991 births
Living people
Italian male rowers
Rowers of Marina Militare
World Rowing Championships medalists for Italy